J. W. McFarland was a state legislator in Mississippi. He represented Rankin County, Mississippi in the Mississippi House of Representatives in 1874 and 1875.

He married Mary Birdson in 1870. Wilson Hicks also represented the county at that time.

See also
African-American officeholders during and following the Reconstruction era

References

African-American state legislators in Mississippi
Members of the Mississippi House of Representatives
African-American politicians during the Reconstruction Era
People from Rankin County, Mississippi
Year of birth missing
Year of death missing